"Who Needs Pictures" is a debut song co-written and recorded by American country music artist Brad Paisley. It was released in February 1999 as his debut single, as well as the first single and title track from his album Who Needs Pictures. It reached number 12 on the Hot Country Songs chart. Paisley wrote this song with Frank Rogers and Chris DuBois.

Content
The song's protagonist tells of finding an undeveloped camera, which contains pictures of him and his previous lover - enjoying themselves in Cozumel, Mexico, and Baton Rouge, Louisiana. At first, he considers developing the film in the camera, but then, he changes his mind, asking himself, "Who needs pictures / With a memory like mine?"

Music video
This was Paisley's first music video, directed by Jim Shea, was filmed in Los Angeles.

Personnel
Eddie Bayers – drums
Glen Duncan – fiddle, mandolin
James Gregory – bass guitar
Bernie Herms – piano, Hammond B-3 organ, string, strings arrangements
Wes Hightower – background vocals
Mike Johnson – steel guitar, Dobro
Tim Lauer – accordion
Brad Paisley – lead vocals, electric guitar, acoustic guitar, six string bass
Frank Rogers – banjo

Chart performance
"Who Needs Pictures" debuted at number 75 on the Billboard Hot Country Songs dated for the week ending February 6, 1999. It spent 31 weeks on the charts and peaked at number 12.

Year-end charts

References

Brad Paisley songs
1999 debut singles
Songs written by Brad Paisley
Songs written by Frank Rogers (record producer)
Song recordings produced by Frank Rogers (record producer)
Songs written by Chris DuBois
Arista Nashville singles
1999 songs